Mahoosuc Notch is a deep gap in the Mahoosuc Range of western Maine in the United States. It is traversed by the Appalachian Trail.

Description
The boulders on this mile-long section of trail present obstacles that must be climbed over and sometimes under, creating a unique hiking experience. There are occasional  drops, and places where packs must be removed to squeeze beneath a boulder.

Many hikers call this stretch one of the slowest on the approximately  trail. This so-called "killer mile" or the "Toughest Mile" is a very tough section that can cause even the most experienced hikers to slow down.

Image gallery

References

External links

 Backpacker.com: Hiking The Mahoosuc Range

Appalachian Trail
Mountain passes of Maine
Landforms of Oxford County, Maine